Horné Zahorany is a village and municipality in the Rimavská Sobota District of the Banská Bystrica Region of southern Slovakia. Village is a birthplace of Slovak writer Ľudovít Kubáni. Among the cultural sightseeings are classical evangelical church and a belfry from 1790.

History
In historical records, the village was first mentioned in 1323 (1323 Hegmeg, 1773 Zahorany). In 1566 it was pillaged and it had been so devastated, that later locals settled a new village on a new place. Inhabitants had been engaged in livestock breeding.

Genealogical resources

The records for genealogical research are available at the state archive "Statny Archiv in Banska Bystrica, Slovakia"

 Roman Catholic church records (births/marriages/deaths): 1769-1851 (parish B)
 Lutheran church records (births/marriages/deaths): 1788-1903 (parish B)

See also
 List of municipalities and towns in Slovakia

References

External links
 
 
http://www.e-obce.sk/obec/horne%20zahorany/horne-zahorany.html
Surnames of living people in Horne Zahorany

Villages and municipalities in Rimavská Sobota District